Julián Bértola Alareo (25 February 1895 – unknown) was an Uruguayan football player and manager who played as a right-half.

Playing career

Club
A right-half, an older version of a right midfielder, Bértola was a product of Nacional youth system, making his senior debut in a 1-0 win versus River Plate Football Club on 2 May 1913. He made a total of 18 appearances for the club during three steps: 1913–1914, 1916, 1917–1919. Along with Nacional, he got the 1917 Campeonato Uruguayo, making 3 appearances in the championship.

In 1917, Bértola joined Brazilian side Grêmio. After his retirement, he worked as Consul of the club in Montevideo.

International
In September 1916, Bértola took part in a 1-2 loss of the Uruguay national team versus Grêmio in Porto Alegre, Brazil

Coaching career
At the amateur era, it was normal that the team captains performed as the head coach and/or fitness coach of his teams. So, in 1917, Bértola performed as player, captain, manager and fitness coach of Nacional at the same time. 

In the same year, Bértola and his teammates took part of the training sessions of both the Chile and the Brazil national teams at the Estadio Parque Central before the 1917 South American Championship. On 30 September 1917, he officially assumed as the Chile national team coach for the championship, where Chile loss all the matches: 0-4 versus Uruguay, 0-1 versus Argentina, 0-5 versus Brazil.

In the same year, Bértola coached the Uruguay national team.

Personal life
At the same time he was a football player and coach, he performed as a PE Teacher.

Honours
Nacional
 Campeonato Uruguayo (1): 1917
 Copa de Honor (2): 1914, 1917
 Copa Competencia (3): 1913, 1914, 1919

References

External links
 Julián Bértola at AtilioSoftware (in Spanish)
 Julián Bértola at PartidosdelaRoja (in Spanish)

1895 births
Footballers from Montevideo
Uruguayan footballers
Uruguay international footballers
Association football midfielders
Club Nacional de Football players
Grêmio Foot-Ball Porto Alegrense players
Uruguayan Primera División players
Uruguayan football managers
Club Nacional de Football managers
Uruguayan Primera División managers
Chile national football team managers
Uruguay national football team managers
Uruguayan expatriate footballers
Uruguayan expatriate football managers
Uruguayan expatriate sportspeople in Brazil
Expatriate footballers in Brazil
Uruguayan expatriate sportspeople in Chile
Expatriate football managers in Chile
Place of death missing
Year of death missing